Sing the Troubled Beast/Diablo Guapo is a 2005 compilation of the two sole full-length studio albums originally released by Louisville post-hardcore band Bastro - Diablo Guapo (1989) and Sing the Troubled Beast (1990). Released via Drag City, the compilation includes all of the tracks from both of these albums in their original order, except one ("Pretty Smart On My Part" off of Diablo Guapo, a Phil Ochs cover).

Track listing

"Demons Begone" - 2:42
"Krakow, Illinois" - 2:41
"I Come From a Long Line of Shipbuilders" - 3:42
"Tobacco in the Sink" - 2:59
"Recidivist" - 2:31
"Floating Home" - 4:12
"Jefferson-In-Drag" - 2:54
"The Sifter" - 2:24
"Noise/Star" - 3:27
"Recidivist" - 2:39
"Tallow Waters" - 1:49
"Filthy Five, Filthy Ten" - 2:49
"Guapo" - 1:59
"Flesh-Colored House" - 1:55
"Short-Haired Robot" - 2:55
"Can of Whoopass" - 2:49
"Decent Skin" - 3:19
"Engaging the Reverend" - 1:57
"Wurlitzer" - 1:49
"Hossier Logic" - 2:18
"Shoot Me a Deer" - 2:16

Sources:
Diablo Guapo (1989): tracks 11-21
Sing the Troubled Beast (1990): tracks 1-10

Personnel
Adapted from Allmusic:

Clark Johnson - performer
David Grubbs - performer
John McEntire - performer
Bastro - writer
William Bennett - drill (track 14)
Britt Walford - drums (track 21)

References

Post-hardcore compilation albums
2005 compilation albums
Drag City (record label) compilation albums